Cavarzano is a village in the municipality of Vernio in the Italian region of Tuscany.  The village is 600 meters above sea level and has a population of approximately 200.  Due to tourism, the population in the summer expands to about 1,200. A prominent landmark in the village is the San Pietro church.

Gallery

External links

 Infos at po-net.prato.it
 Pro Loco Cavarzano

Frazioni of the Province of Prato